In computational learning theory, Occam learning is a model of algorithmic learning where the objective of the learner is to output a succinct representation of received training data. This is closely related to probably approximately correct (PAC) learning, where the learner is evaluated on its predictive power of a test set.

Occam learnability implies PAC learning, and for a wide variety of concept classes, the converse is also true: PAC learnability implies Occam learnability.

Introduction
Occam Learning is named after Occam's razor, which is a principle stating that, given all other things being equal, a shorter explanation for observed data should be favored over a lengthier explanation. The theory of Occam learning is a formal and mathematical justification for this principle. It was first shown by Blumer, et al. that Occam learning implies PAC learning, which is the standard model of learning in computational learning theory. In other words, parsimony (of the output hypothesis) implies predictive power.

Definition of Occam learning
Occam learning connects the succinctness of a learning algorithm's output to its predictive power on unseen data.

Let  and  be concept classes containing target concepts and hypotheses respectively.
  
where  is the maximum length of any sample .

The relation between Occam and PAC learning
Occam learnability implies PAC learnability, as the following theorem of Blumer, et al. shows:

Theorem (Occam learning implies PAC learning) 
Let  be an efficient  -Occam algorithm for  using . This implies that the algorithm  is also a PAC learner for the concept class  using hypothesis class . A slightly more general formulation is as follows:

Theorem (Occam learning implies PAC learning, cardinality version) 
Let . Let  be an algorithm such that, given  samples drawn from a fixed but unknown distribution  and labeled according to a concept  of length  bits each, outputs a hypothesis  that is consistent with the labeled samples. Then, there exists a constant  such that if , then   is guaranteed to output a hypothesis  such that  with probability at least .

While the above theorems show that Occam learning is sufficient for PAC learning, it doesn't say anything about necessity. Board and Pitt show that, for a wide variety of concept classes, Occam learning is in fact necessary for PAC learning. They proved that for any concept class that is polynomially closed under exception lists, PAC learnability implies the existence of an Occam algorithm for that concept class. Concept classes that are polynomially closed under exception lists include Boolean formulas, circuits, deterministic finite automata, decision-lists, decision-trees, and other geometrically-defined concept classes.

A concept class  is polynomially closed under exception lists if there exists a polynomial-time algorithm  such that, when given the representation of a concept  and a finite list  of exceptions, outputs a representation of a concept  such that the concepts  and  agree except on the set .

Proof that Occam learning implies PAC learning

We first prove the Cardinality version. Call a hypothesis  bad if , where again  is with respect to the true concept  and the underlying distribution . This concludes the proof of the second theorem above.

Using the second theorem, we can prove the first theorem. Since we have a -Occam algorithm, this means that any hypothesis output by  can be represented by at most  bits, and thus . This is less than  if we set  for some constant . Thus, by the Cardinality version Theorem,  will output a consistent hypothesis  with probability at least . This concludes the proof of the first theorem above.

Improving sample complexity for common problems
Though Occam and PAC learnability are equivalent, the Occam framework can be used to produce tighter bounds on the sample complexity of classical problems including conjunctions, conjunctions with few relevant variables, and decision lists.

Extensions 
Occam algorithms have also been shown to be successful for PAC learning in the presence of errors, probabilistic concepts, function learning and Markovian non-independent examples.

See also
 Structural Risk Minimization
 Computational learning theory

References

Theoretical computer science
Computational learning theory